Iciliidae is a family of crustaceans belonging to the order Amphipoda.

Genera:
 Icilius Dana, 1849
 Paraneohela Oldevig, 1959

References

Amphipoda